Clouds Taste Metallic is the seventh studio album by American rock band The Flaming Lips, released on September 19, 1995 by Warner Bros. Records. It was the last album to feature guitarist Ronald Jones. The album's recording is heavily featured in the Fearless Freaks documentary.

Clouds Taste Metallic was projected to be the band's first commercially successful release after the major success of "She Don't Use Jelly" from their previous album Transmissions from the Satellite Heart (1993), but failed to garner the same commercial success of its predecessor. However, in recent years, it has been regarded by critics and fans as one of the Flaming Lips' best albums, and has achieved cult status.

The name of the album comes from an account by former Tool bassist Paul D'Amour. After flying through a cloud in a roofless airplane, the pilot remarked: "You know, it's weird, clouds taste metallic."

Track listing

Heady Nuggs: 20 Years After Clouds Taste Metallic
On December 18, 2015, Heady Nuggs: 20 Years After Clouds Taste Metallic: 1994-1997 was released, which contained a three-CD or five-LP compilation including the album, the 1994 odds-and-ends EP Due to High Expectations... The Flaming Lips Are Providing Needles for Your Balloons, a previously unreleased concert called Psychiatric Exploration Of The Fetus With Needles (Live In Seattle 1996), and a further rarities collection titled The King Bug Laughs. The CD only release also contains an original comic written and illustrated by Wayne Coyne. The vinyl reissue of Clouds Taste Metallic contains autographs signed by Wayne Coyne, and the deluxe edition contains a bundle of several out of print posters & T-shirts of the band that were originally available at concerts on their tour in 1995-1996 in support of Clouds Taste Metallic. Also included are digital downloads for songs such as the 1996 live versions of "Psychiatric Explorations of the Fetus With Needles" and "Put The Waterbug In The Policeman's Ear", studio versions of both said songs, and two additional studio recordings of "Hot Day", which was recorded for the soundtrack to the 1996 film subUrbia,  and "Chosen One", which is a cover of Smog.

Personnel
 Wayne Coyne – vocals, guitar
 Steven Drozd – drums, piano, keyboards, guitar, vocals, glockenspiel
 Michael Ivins – bass, backing vocals
 Ronald Jones – guitar, vocals

Alternate version
As part of Record Store Day 2016, the CD Lightning Strikes the Postman was released.  This was an alternate mix of Clouds Taste Metallic prominently featuring ex-guitarist Ronald Jones.

Cover versions
"They Punctured My Yolk" was sampled on the Beastie Boys' album To the 5 Boroughs in the song "We Got The." "Lightning Strikes the Postman" was covered by Scottish rock band Aereogramme on their album Seclusion.

References

1995 albums
The Flaming Lips albums
Warner Records albums
Albums produced by Dave Fridmann